The Airbus A310 MRTT Multi-Role Tanker Transport is a military air-to-air refuelling, or in-flight refuelling tanker transport aircraft, capable of operating multi-role missions. The A310 MRTT tanker aircraft is a subsequent development from the earlier Airbus A310 MRT Multi-Role Transport, which was a military transport aircraft for passengers, cargo, and medical evacuation. The A310 MRT and A310 MRTT are both specialist military conversions of existing airframes of the civilian Airbus A310-300C wide-bodied passenger jet airliner.

Airbus A310 MRTT

Design and development

The Airbus A310 MRTT Multi-Role Tanker Transport is a military derivative of the Airbus A310-300C twin-jet wide-bodied jet airliner. The A310 MRTT was primarily designed for military use as a multi-role air-to-air refuelling tanker, cargo transport, passenger transport, and aeromedical evacuation (MedEvac) aircraft.

The aircraft are designed, engineered, manufactured, and modified by Airbus Industrie and EADS subsidiary Airbus Military SAS, along with their subcontractors, which included Airbus Deutschland and Lufthansa Technik. The conversion from the A310 MRT involves:
Installation of two air-to-air refuelling (AAR) pods, one under each wing, close to the wingtip;
Fuel operator station (FOS), in the cockpit immediately behind the captain, to control fuel offload, cameras, military radios, and exterior lighting. For MRTT, remote surveillance of approaching / air-to-air refuelling process with a night-vision capable video system had to be developed. This system (developed by a small company from Germany called FTI Group) allows operation both with visible light, and also near-infrared radiation. The refuelling monitor was integrated in the year 2008.;
Reinforced wings and aircraft floor;
Minor cockpit modifications.
The design of the in-flight refuelling pod and wing reinforcements and systems was subcontracted to ITD SA, at that time part of the Industria de Turbo Propulsores (ITP) Group.

When used in a troop transport role, the A310 MRTT can accommodate up to 214 seats. And for a mixed-use combined troop transport and cargo, it can carry 54 troops and 12 pallets. The A310 MRTT contains four separate cargo systems within the fuselage, including the main deck cargo compartment, which is loaded and unloaded via the vertically opening main deck cargo door, located on the front left (port) side. This means that main deck cargo can be loaded by overhead crane, in addition to conventional cargo loading platforms.

When used in the aero-medical MedEvac role, the A310 MRTT can accommodate up to six intensive care units, together with 56 conventional stretchers.

Operated by a crew of three: two pilots and the air-to-air refuelling (AAR) operator, the pilots are able to directly operate all functions of in-flight refuelling, even if the AAR post is deactivated. All fuel to receiver aircraft is supplied directly from the centre tank, if necessary, drawing fuel from conventional fuel tanks; this is controlled automatically by the fuel management system together with the centre of gravity computer, to ensure correct fuel feed to the engines, and maintaining the correct centre of gravity in flight.

The dual hose and drogue system was supplied by Flight Refuelling Ltd (FRL) of England, and uses the Mk32B pods under each wing on pylons, close to the wingtips.

The German Air Force (Luftwaffe) was the first customer for the MRTT, converting four of their seven existing A310 MRTs, with deliveries starting in October 2004. The Royal Canadian Air Force (RCAF) converted two of their five existing A310 MRTs to MRTT configuration, which are known as the CC-150 Polaris in Canadian service, the first also delivered October 2004.

During June 2007, EADS delivered the first upgraded A310 MRTT with new mission avionics to the German Air Force. This new mission avionics suite facilitated the allocation of the upgraded A310 MRTT to NATO Reaction Forces.

While the original and current A310 MRTTs rely on probe and drogue for air-to-air refuelling, EADS has invested $90m in research and development of a flying boom refuelling system such as that used by the United States Air Force (USAF). They are now able to offer air tankers from the A310 with air-to-air refuelling pods to the larger A330 MRTT equipped with refuelling booms.

The A310 MRTT is 30% smaller by MTOW than the newer A330 MRTT. Since the production of A310 airframes was discontinued in 2007, the air-to-air refuelling conversion can only be made on existing refurbished airliners, or as an upgrade to A310 MRTs already used by air forces (the option taken by Germany and Canada). As an air tanker, it has a similar fuel capacity to the KC-135R. Because of the larger passenger cabin, it is much more flexible, offering good capacity for cargo, troop transport, VIP transport, or other uses; and lacking only the capacity to land on rough strips to qualify as a strategic transport. Airbus hopes to sell it to some of the countries that need to replace the aging Boeing 707s they use as tankers.

The objective of the deployment to India was to demonstrate the Eurofighter in a competition for Medium Multi-Role Combat Aircraft (MMRCA), against competition from the Mikoyan MiG-35, the Saab Gripen, the Lockheed Martin F-16, the Boeing F-18E / F, and the Dassault Rafale.

Pakistan has also ordered MRTT capability built on an A310, although the aircraft is no longer in production.

Specifications (A310 MRTT)

See also

References

External links

Aircraft first flown in 2003
A310 MRTT
2000s international military tanker aircraft
2000s international military transport aircraft
Twinjets
Low-wing aircraft
German military transport aircraft
Canadian military transport aircraft